Fallout: London is an upcoming total conversion mod of Bethesda Softworks' Fallout 4. It will take place in a post-apocalyptic rendition of London, and is notable for its departure from a US setting. An 18-minute gameplay trailer for the mod was released on May 18th, 2022. The mod is scheduled to be released sometime in 2023.

Story 
Fallout: London is set in 2237, placing it between the events of Fallout 1 and 2. The story begins after a lab break-in, where the player must escape to the surface. There will be a number of new factions vying for control of London during the story.

Development 
Fallout: London has been in development since 2019. It will have a main map around the same size as Fallout 4, with its five smaller hub areas combining to be roughly the same size as the Far Harbour DLC.

References

External links 

 Fallout: London official website

Upcoming video games scheduled for 2023
Interquel video games
Video game mods
Video games set in London
Video games set in the 23rd century
Role-playing video games
Windows games